Vítězslav Pavlousek (born 27 May 1911, date of death unknown) was a Czech sailor. He competed in the O-Jolle event at the 1936 Summer Olympics.

References

External links
 

1911 births
Year of death missing
Czech male sailors (sport)
Olympic sailors of Czechoslovakia
Sailors at the 1936 Summer Olympics – O-Jolle
Place of birth missing